WVYN is a Radio Station in broadcasting on 90.9 MHz FM, licensed to Bluford, Illinois. The station airs a Contemporary Christian music format, and serves the areas of Mt. Vernon, Illinois, McLeansboro, Illinois, and Fairfield, Illinois. WVYN is owned by Pure Word Communications, through licensee Pure Word Radio, Inc.

WVYN signed on the air on June 21, 2009, and initially ran 4,500 watts from a location near Wayne City, Illinois. On May 19, 2011, WVYN moved their transmitter to a location near Dahlgren, Illinois and increased their effective radiated power to 11,000 watts.

References

External links
WVYN's official website

Contemporary Christian radio stations in the United States
Radio stations established in 2009
VYN